Alan Crocker Pittard  (15 November 1902 – 25 December 1992) was an Australian politician. Born in Ballarat, Victoria to state politician Alfred Pittard, he attended Ballarat Grammar School before becoming a shoe retailer. He served on Ballarat City Council before serving in the military 1939–45. In 1949, he was elected to the Australian House of Representatives as the Liberal member for Ballaarat. He was defeated by Labor's Bob Joshua in 1951, and returned to Ballarat as a businessman. He was later Commissioner of the Victorian Public Health Authority. Pittard died on Christmas Day 1992.

References

Liberal Party of Australia members of the Parliament of Australia
Members of the Australian House of Representatives for Ballarat
Members of the Australian House of Representatives
Officers of the Order of the British Empire
1902 births
1992 deaths
20th-century Australian politicians